Appoquinimink High School (AHS) is a public high school in Middletown, Delaware. It is a part of the Appoquinimink School District.

Construction of the two-story building began in 2006 and ninth grade students were housed in the former Alfred G. Waters School building for the duration of the construction. Felecia Duggins was selected as school principal in May 2007 and the campus' stadium and 1,067-seat fieldhouse opened that fall. Administrators gave students at Everett Meredith and Louis L. Redding middle schools the choice between the jaguars, pirates, and titans for the new high school's mascot; the most popular choice was the jaguar.

The school opened in 2008 and has a capacity of 1,600 students.

Notable alumni
Renee Bull, Miss Delaware 2015 
A.J. English III, player in the Polish Basketball League

References

External links
 Appoquinimink High School

Public high schools in Delaware
Educational institutions established in 2008
2008 establishments in Delaware
Middletown, Delaware
High schools in New Castle County, Delaware